Doutor Camargo is a municipality in the state of Paraná in the Southern Region of Brazil. The name means Doctor Camarago.

See also
List of municipalities in Paraná

References

Municipalities in Paraná